This list of the Cenozoic life of North Carolina contains the various prehistoric life-forms whose fossilized remains have been reported from within the US state of North Carolina and are between 66 million and 10,000 years of age.

A

  Abies
 †Abra
 †Abra aequalis
 †Abra subreflexa
 Acanthocybium
  †Acanthocybium solandri
 †Acantholambrus
 †Acantholambrus baumi
 †Acarinina
 †Acarinina perclara
 †Achrochordiella – type locality for genus
 †Achrochordiella vokesi – type locality for species
 Acipenser
 †Acipenser oxyrhynchus – or unidentified comparable form
 Acrosterigma
 Acteocina
 †Acteocina canaliculata
 †Acteocina candei
  †Actinocyclus
 †Actinocyclus elipticus
 †Actinocyclus ingens
 †Actinocyclus octonarius
 †Actinocyclus tenellus
 Actinocythereis
 †Actinocythereis captionis
 †Actinocythereis dawsoni
 †Actinocythereis gosportensis
 †Actinocythereis marylandica
 †Actinocythereis mundorffi
 †Actinoptychus
 †Actinoptychus marylandicus
 †Actinoptychus senarius
 †Actinoptychus virginicus
 †Acuticythereis
 †Acuticythereis lavissima
  Aequipecten
 †Aequipecten eboerus
 †Aequipecten eboreus
 Aesopus
 †Aesopus gardnerae
 †Aesopus stearnsii
  Aetobatus
 Agaronia
 Agassizia
 †Agassizia scrobiculata
 †Agassizia wilmingtonensis
 †Agassizia wilmingtonica
 Agatrix
 †Agatrix mississippiensis
 †Akleistostoma
 †Akleistostoma carolinensis
 †Akleistostoma pilsbryi – type locality for species
 Alabamina
 †Alabamina wilcoxensis
 †Albertella
 †Albertella aberta
 †Albertocetus – type locality for genus
 †Albertocetus meffordorum – type locality for species
  Alca
 †Alca ausonia
 †Alca carolinensis – type locality for species
 †Alca grandis – type locality for species
 †Alca minor – type locality for species
 †Alca olsoni – type locality for species
 †Alca torda – or unidentified related form
 Aligena
 †Aligena rhomboidea
 †Aligena striata
 Alnus
 Alopias
  †Alopias superciliosus
 †Alopias vulpinus
 Alosa
 †Alosa sapidissima – or unidentified comparable form
  Aluterus
 †Ambrosia
 Americardia
 †Americardia media
  Ammodytes
 †Ammodytes hexapterus
 Amusium
 †Amusium mortoni
 †Anabernicula
 †Anabernicula minuscula – or unidentified comparable form
  Anachis
 †Anachis aurora
 †Anachis avara
 †Anachis milleri
 †Anachis styliola
 Anadara
 †Anadara aequicostata
  †Anadara brasiliana
 †Anadara callicestosa
 †Anadara floridana
 †Anadara lienosa
 †Anadara magnoliana
 †Anadara ovalis
 †Anadara rustica
 †Anadara scalaris
 †Anadara silverdalensis – type locality for species
 †Anadara transversa
 Anas
 †Anas acuta
 †Anas americana
  †Anas clypeata
 †Anas discors
 †Anas platyrhynchos
 †Anaulus
 †Anaulus mediterraneus
 Anchistrocheles
 †Anchistrocheles c informal
 Angulogerina
 †Angulogerina occidentalis
 Angulus
 †Angulus agilis
 †Angulus texanus
  Anisotremus
 †Annellus
 †Annellus californicus
 Anodontia
 †Anodontia alba
 Anomia
 †Anomia filamentosa
 †Anomia ruffini
 †Anomia simplex
 †Anomotodon
 †Anomotodon cravenensis – type locality for species
 †Anomotodon nova
 †Anoplonassa
 Anser
 †Anser arizonae – or unidentified comparable form
  Apalone – or unidentified comparable form
 †Apiocyphraea
 Aprionodon
 †Aprionodon acuaris
 †Aprixokogia – type locality for genus
 †Aprixokogia kelloggi – type locality for species
 †Araeodelphis
 †Araeodelphis natator – or unidentified comparable form
 †Araloselachus
 †Araloselachus cuspidata
  Arbacia
 †Arbacia improcera
 †Arbacia sloani – or unidentified comparable form
 Arca
 †Arca cancellata – tentative report
 †Archimediella
 †Archimediella duplinensis
 Architectonica
 †Architectonica fungina
 †Archosargus
  †Archosargus probatocephalus – or unidentified comparable form
  Arcinella
 †Arcinella cornuta
 Arcopsis
 †Arcopsis adamsi
 Ardea
  †Ardea cinerea – or unidentified related form
 Argopecten
 †Argopecten erboreus
 †Argopecten gibbus
 †Argopecten irradians
 Argyrotheca
 †Argyrotheca quadrata – type locality for species
 Arossia
 †Arossia aurae
 †Arossia glyptopoma
 †Artemisia
 Artena
 †Artena lamellacea – type locality for species
  Astarte
 †Astarte berryi
 †Astarte claytonrayi
 †Astarte concentrica
 †Astarte crenata
 †Astarte onslowensis – type locality for species
 †Astarte rappahannockensis
 †Astarte symmetrica
 †Astarte thisphila – tentative report
 †Astarte undulata
 †Asteromphalus
 †Asteromphalus robustus
 †Astroscopus
 Astyris
 †Astyris lunata
 Athleta
  †Atocetus – or unidentified related form
 Atrina
  †Aturia
 †Aturia alabamensis
 Aurila
 †Aurila laevicula
 †Auroracetus – type locality for genus
 †Auroracetus bakerae – type locality for species
 Auxis
 Axelella
 †Axelella vokesae – type locality for species
 Aythya
 †Aythya affinis – or unidentified related form

B

 †Bactronella
 †Bactronella incrustans – type locality for species
 †Bactronella womblei – type locality for species
 Bagre
 Bairdia
 Bairdoppilata
 †Bairdoppilata triangulata
 Balaena
 Balaenoptera
  †Balaenoptera acutorostrata
 †Balaenoptera borealina
  †Balaenula
  Balanophyllia
 Balanus
 †Balanus halosydne
 Balcis
 †Balcis beufortensis
 †Balcis biconica
  Balearica – tentative report
  Barbatia
 †Barbatia carolinensis
 †Barbatia cuculloides – or unidentified comparable form
 Barnea
 †Barnea arcuata
 †Barnea costata
 †Basilotritus
 †Basilotritus wardii – type locality for species
 Basterotia
 †Basterotia carolina
 †Basterotia elliptica
 Bathytormus
 †Bathytormus flexurus – or unidentified comparable form
 †Bathytormus protexta
 Bellucina
 †Bellucina waccamawensis
 †Belosaepia
 Bensonocythere
 †Bensonocythere blackwelderi
 †Bensonocythere bradyi
 †Bensonocythere calverti
 †Bensonocythere gouldensis
 †Bensonocythere m informal
 †Bensonocythere oo informal
 †Bensonocythere pp informal
 †Bensonocythere qq informal
 †Bensonocythere ricespitensis
 †Bensonocythere rr informal
 †Bensonocythere rugosa
 †Bensonocythere trapezoidalis
 †Bensonocythere whitei
  Betula
 Bicorbula
 †Bicorbula idonea
 †Biddulphia
 †Biddulphia aurita
 †Biddulphia tuomeyii
 Bittium
 †Bittium podagrinum
  †Bohaskaia
 †Bohaskaia monodontoides
 Bolivina
 †Bolivina calvertensis
 †Bolivina floridana
 †Bolivina paula
 †Bolivina plicatella
 †Bolivina pungoensis
 †Bolivinopsis
 †Bolivinopsis fairhavenensis
 Boonea
 †Boonea impressa
  †Boonea seminuda
 †Bootherium
  †Bootherium bombifrons
 Boreotrophon – report made of unidentified related form or using admittedly obsolete nomenclature
 †Boreotrophon tetricus
 Bornia
 †Bornia bladenensis
 †Bornia longipes
 †Bornia triangula
  †Borophagus
 †Borophagus dudleyi – or unidentified comparable form
 †Borophagus orc – or unidentified comparable form
 Bostrycapulus
 †Bostrycapulus aculeatus
 Botrychium
 †Botrychium dissectum – or unidentified comparable form
 †Botryococcus
 Brachidontes
 Branta
 †Branta bernicla – or unidentified related form
  †Brasenia
 Brizalina
  Brotula
 †Brotula barbata
 Buccella
 †Buccella frigida
 †Bucella
 †Bucella mansfieldi – or unidentified comparable form
 Bucephala
 †Bucephala albeola – or unidentified related form
 †Bucephala clangula – or unidentified related form
 Bulimina
 †Bulimina elongata
 Buliminella
 †Buliminella elegantissima
 †Bulliminella
 †Bulliminella elegantissima
 Bulweria – tentative report
 †Burnhamia
 †Burnhamia daviesi
 Busycon
 †Busycon adversarius
 †Busycon amoenum
 †Busycon aruanum
 †Busycon bladenense
 †Busycon carica
 †Busycon chowanense
  †Busycon contrarium
 †Busycon perversum
 †Busycon spiniger
 †Busycon willcoxi
 †Busycon willcoxiana
 Busycotypus
 †Busycotypus canaliculatus
 †Busycotypus concinnum
 †Busycotypus spiratus
 Buteo
  †Buteo jamaicensis
 Bythocythere
 †Bythocythere b informal

C

 Cadulus
 †Cadulus quadridentatus
 Caecum
 †Caecum beaufortensis
 †Caecum flemingi
 †Caecum imbricatum
 †Caecum pulchellum
 †Caecum regulare
 †Caecum stevensoni
  †Calappilia
 †Calappilia sitzi
 Calidris
  †Calidris melanotos – or unidentified related form
 Callinectes
  †Callinectes sapidus
 Calliostoma
 †Calliostoma bella – or unidentified comparable form
 †Calliostoma philanthropum
 †Calliostoma virginicum
 †Calliostoma willcoxianum
 Callista
 †Callista neusensis
 Callocardia
 †Callocardia castoriana
 †Callocardia chioneformis
 †Callophoca
 †Callophoca ambigua
 †Callophoca obscura
 Callucina
 †Callucina keenae
 Calonectris
  †Calonectris borealis – or unidentified related form
 †Calonectris diomedea – or unidentified related form
 †Calonectris krantzi – type locality for species
 Calotrophon
 †Calotrophon ostrearum
 Calyptraea
 †Calyptraea centralis
 Campylocythere
 †Campylocythere laeva
  Cancellaria
 †Cancellaria rotunda
 †Cannopilus
 †Cannopilus a informal
 †Cannopilus b informal
 †Cannopilus binoculus
 †Cannopilus haeckelii
 †Cannopilus hemisphaericus
 †Cannopilus sphaericus
 †Cannopilus triommata
 Capella
 †Capella media – or unidentified related form
 Carcharhinus
 †Carcharhinus brachyurus
  †Carcharhinus falciformis
 †Carcharhinus gibbesi
 †Carcharhinus leucas
 †Carcharhinus macloti
 †Carcharhinus obscurus
 †Carcharhinus perezi
 †Carcharhinus plumbeus
 †Carcharhinus priscus
 Carcharias
 †Carcharias taurus
 Carcharodon
 †Carcharodon auriculatus
  †Carcharodon carcharias
  †Carcharodon hastalis
 †Carcharodon subauriculatus
 Cardiolucina
 †Cardiolucina postalveata
 Carditamera
 †Carditamera arata
 †Carditamera columbiana
 †Carditamera floridana
 
 †Cardium belgradensis
  Caretta
 †Caretta patriciae
 †Caricella
 †Carolinapecten
 †Carolinapecten eboreus
  Carya
 Caryocorbula
 †Caryocorbula auroraensis
 †Caryocorbula caribaea
 †Caryocorbula conradi
 †Caryocorbula contracta
 Cassidulina
 †Cassidulina laevigata
 †Cassigerinella
 †Cassigerinella chipolensis
 Cassis
 Castanea
 Catharacta
 Caudites
 †Caudites paraasymmetricus
 †Caulolatilus
 †Caulolatilus cyanops – or unidentified comparable form
 Cavilinga
 †Cavilinga trisulcata
 †Cavilinga trisulcatus
 †Cavilucina
 Celleporaria
 †Celleporaria albirostris – or unidentified comparable form
 Centropristis
  †Centropristis striata – or unidentified comparable form
 Cerastoderma
 †Cerastoderma acutilaqueatum
  Ceratoscopelus
 †Ceratoscopelus maderensis
 †Cerberorhaphidites – type locality for genus
 †Cerberorhaphidites auriformis – type locality for species
 Cerithiopsis
 †Cerithiopsis vinca
 Cerithium
 †Cerithium eburneum
 Cerodrillia – report made of unidentified related form or using admittedly obsolete nomenclature
 †Cerodrillia simpsoni
 †Ceronnectes
 †Ceronnectes granulosa – type locality for species
  †Cerorhinca
 Cetorhinus
  †Cetotherium
 †Cetotherium polyporum – type locality for species
 Chaetopleura
 Chama
 †Chama congregata
 †Chama gardnerae
 †Chama macerophylla
 †Chama richardsi
 Chamelea
 †Chamelea spada
 Champsodelphis – or unidentified comparable form
 Chelonia – tentative report
  Chelonibia
 †Chelonibia melleni
 Chemnitzia
 †Chesacardium
 †Chesacardium acutilacqueatum
 †Chesacardium acutilaqueatum
 †Chesaconcavus
 †Chesaconcavus proteus
 †Chesapecten
 †Chesapecten coccymelus
  †Chesapecten jeffersonius
 †Chesapecten madisonius
 †Chesapecten middlesexensis
 †Chesapecten nefrens – tentative report
 Chilomycterus
  †Chilomycterus schoepfi
 †Chilomycterus schoepfii
 Chione
  †Chione cancellata
 †Chione cortinaria
 †Chione cribraria
 †Chione imitabilis
  Chlamys
 †Chlamys biddleana – type locality for species
 †Chlamys cawcawensis
 †Chlamys cookei – type locality for species
 †Chlamys cushmani – type locality for species
 †Chlamys decemnaria
 †Chlamys deshayesii
 †Chlamys membranosa
 †Chlamys membranosus
  Chrysemys
 Cibicides
 †Cibicides croatanensis
 †Cibicides lobatulus
 Cibicidina
 †Cibicidina blanpiedi
 Cibicidoides
 †Cibicidoides lawi
  Ciconia
 †Ciconia speciesone informal
 †Ciconia speciestwo informal
 Cidaris
 †Cidaris pratti
 Circulus – report made of unidentified related form or using admittedly obsolete nomenclature
 †Circulus orbignyi
 Citharichthys
 Cladocora
 †Cladogramma
 †Cladogramma dubium
 Clathrodrillia – report made of unidentified related form or using admittedly obsolete nomenclature
 †Clathrodrillia emmonsi
  Clathrus
 †Clathrus antillarum
 Clavatula
 †Clavatula cornelliana
 †Clavicula
 †Clavicula polymorpha
 †Clavidrupa
 †Clavidrupa anita
  Clavilithes – or unidentified comparable form
 †Clavilithes abruptus
 Clavus – report made of unidentified related form or using admittedly obsolete nomenclature
 †Clavus drewi
 †Clavus polygonalis
 †Claytonia – type locality for genus
 †Claytonia rayi – type locality for species
 Clidiophora
 †Clidiophora crassidens
 †Clidiophora tuomeyi
 †Clidiophora tuorneyi
  Cliona – tentative report
 Clithrocytheridea
 †Clithrocytheridea garretti
 Closia
 †Closia antiqua
 †Cnestocythere – tentative report
 †Cocaia
 †Cocaia grigsbyi
 Cochliolepis
 †Cochliolepis holmesi
 Cochlodesma
 †Cochlodesma emmonsii
  Coelopleurus
 †Coelopleurus carolinensis
 †Coelopleurus infulatus
 Colubraria
 †Colubraria aclinica
 †Colymboides – tentative report
 Compsodrillia
 †Compsodrillia chowanensis
 Concavus
 †Concavus crassostricola
 Conger
  †Conger oceanicus – or unidentified comparable form
 Congeria
 †Congeria leucopheatus
 †Conradostrea
 †Conradostrea lawrencei
 †Conradostrea sculpturata
  Conus
 †Conus mutilatus – tentative report
 †Conus postalveatus – type locality for species
 †Conus sauridens
 Cooperella
 †Cooperella carpenteri
 Corbicula
 †Corbicula densata
 †Corbisema
 †Corbisema tracantha
 Corbula
 †Corbula inaequalis
 Corvus
  †Corvus ossifragus – or unidentified related form
 †Corylus
  †Coscinodiscus
 †Coscinodiscus apiculatus
 †Coscinodiscus asteromphalus
 †Coscinodiscus curvatulus
 †Coscinodiscus gigas
 †Coscinodiscus lewisianus
 †Coscinodiscus marginatus
 †Coscinodiscus monicae
 †Coscinodiscus nitidus
 †Coscinodiscus nodulifer
 †Coscinodiscus oculus
 †Coscinodiscus perforatus
 †Coscinodiscus plicatus
 †Coscinodiscus praeyabei
 †Coscinodiscus rothii
 †Coscinodiscus stellaris
 †Coscinodiscus vetustissimus
 †Cosmodiscus
 †Cosmodiscus elegans
 Cosmotriphora
 †Cosmotriphora dupliniana
 Costacallista
 †Costacallista emmonsi
 †Costaglycymeris
 †Costaglycymeris subovata
 Cotonopsis
  †Cotonopsis lafresnayi
 Crania
 †Craspedodiscus
 †Craspedodiscus coscinodiscus
 Crassatella
 †Crassatella alta
 †Crassatella mississippiensis
 †Crassatella texalta
 †Crassatella wilcoxi
 Crassinella
 †Crassinella dupliniana
 †Crassinella johnsoni
 †Crassinella lunulata
 †Crassinella neuseana
  Crassispira
 †Crassispira perrugata
 Crassostrea
 †Crassostrea virginica
 †Crenatocetus – type locality for genus
 †Crenatocetus rayi – type locality for species
 †Crenatosiren – or unidentified comparable form
 †Crenatosiren olseni
 Crenella
 †Crenella decussata
 Crepidula
 †Crepidula convexa
  †Crepidula fornicata
 †Crepidula lawrencei
 †Crepidula plana
 †Crepidula spinulosa
 Cribrilina
 †Cribrilina punctata
 †Cribrononion
 †Cribrononion preadvena
 †Cribrononion preadvenum – or unidentified comparable form
 Crucibulum
 †Crucibulum constrictum
 †Crucibulum lawrencei
 †Crucibulum multilineatum
 Ctena
 †Ctena magnoliana
 †Ctena microimbricata
 †Ctena speciosa
 †Cubitostrea
 †Cubitostrea sellaeformis
  Cumingia
 †Cumingia tellinoides
 †Cumingia tellionoides
 †Cushamidea – report made of unidentified related form or using admittedly obsolete nomenclature
 Cushmanidea
 †Cushmanidea seminuda
 †Cussia
 †Cussia paleacea
 †Cussia praepaleacea
  †Cuvieronius
 Cyclocardia
 †Cyclocardia granulata
 †Cyclocardia trentensis
 †Cyclocolposa
 †Cyclocolposa perforata
 Cyclostremiscus
 †Cyclostremiscus obliquestriatus
 †Cyclotella
 †Cyclotella kelloggi
 Cygnus
  †Cygnus columbianus – or unidentified related form
 Cylichna
 †Cylichna duplinensis
 †Cylindracanthus
 †Cylindracanthus rectus
 Cymatium
 †Cymatium planinodum – type locality for species
 †Cymatogonia
 †Cymatogonia amblyoceros
 †Cymatosira
 †Cymatosira a informal
 †Cymatosira andersoni
 †Cymatosira immunis
  Cymatosyrinx
 †Cymatosyrinx limatula – or unidentified comparable form
 †Cymatosyrinx lunata
 †Cymatosyrinx tiara
 †Cymatosyrinx ziczac
 Cynoscion
  †Cynoscion nebulosus – or unidentified comparable form
  †Cynthiacetus
 †Cynthiacetus maxwelli
  Cypraea
 Cyprideis
 †Cyprideis b informal
 Cyrtopleura
 †Cyrtorhina
 †Cyrtorhina fusseli
 Cytherella
 †Cytherella a informal
 †Cytherella b informal
 Cytherelloidea
 †Cytherelloidea a informal
 †Cytherelloidea colata – or unidentified comparable form
 Cytheretta
 †Cytheretta alexanderi
 Cytheridea
 †Cytheridea campwallacensis
 †Cytheridea carolinensis
 †Cytheridea virginiensis
 Cytheromorpha
 †Cytheromorpha curta
 †Cytheromorpha i informal
 †Cytheromorpha incisa
 †Cytheromorpha macroincisa
 †Cytheromorpha suffolkensis
 †Cytheromorpha warneri
 Cytheropteron
 †Cytheropteron talquinensis
 †Cytheropteron yorktownensis
 Cytherura
 †Cytherura aa informal
 †Cytherura bb informal
 †Cytherura d informal
 †Cytherura elongata
 †Cytherura forulata
 †Cytherura howei
 †Cytherura l informal
 †Cytherura m informal
 †Cytherura n informal
 †Cytherura reticulata
 †Cytherura u informal
 †Cytherura w informal
 †Cytherura wardensis

D

 †Dallarca
 †Dallarca elevata – or unidentified related form
 †Dallarca subrostrata
 Dasyatis
  †Dasyatis americana – or unidentified comparable form
 †Dasyatis cavernosa
 †Dasyatis centroura
 †Dasyatis say
 †Deinosuchus
 †Deinosuchus rugosus
  Delphinapterus
 †Delphinapterus orcinus – type locality for species
 †Delphineis
 †Delphineis angustata
 †Delphineis lineata
 †Delphineis novaecaesaraea
 †Delphineis ovata
 †Delphineis penelliptica
 †Delphinodon
 †Delphinodon dividum
 †Delphinodon mento – or unidentified comparable form
 Delphinus
 Democrinus
 Dentalium
 †Dentalium attenuatum
 †Dentalium opaculum – tentative report
 †Denticula
 †Denticula hustedtii
 †Denticula lauta
 †Denticula nicobarica
 †Denticula norwegica
 †Denticula punctata
 Dentimargo
 †Dentimargo polyspira – tentative report
 †Dentimargo polyspria – tentative report
  Dermomurex
 †Dermomurex sexangulus
 †Dicladia
 †Dicladia pylea
  †Dictyocha
 †Dictyocha a informal
 †Dictyocha b informal
 †Dictyocha fibua
 †Dictyocha rhombica
 †Didianema
 †Didianema carolinae
 †Dimarzipecten
 †Dimarzipecten crocus
 Dinocardium
  †Dinocardium robustum
 †Dinocardium taphrium
  Diodora
 †Diodora californis
 †Diodora carolinensis
 †Diodora catillifonnis – or unidentified comparable form
 †Diodora marylandica – or unidentified comparable form
 †Diodora mississippiensis
 †Diodora nucula
 †Diodora penderensis – type locality for species
 †Diodora redimicula
 Diplectrum
 †Diplectrum formosum – or unidentified comparable form
 Diplodonta
 †Diplodonta acclinis
 †Diplodonta berryi
 †Diplodonta caloosaensis
 †Diplodonta felcinella
 †Diplodonta heroni
 †Diplodonta leana
 †Diplodonta punctata
 †Diplodonta soror
 †Diplodonta subvexa
 †Diploneis
 †Diploneis crabro
 †Distephanus
 †Distephanus crux
 †Distephanus speculum
 †Distephanus stauracanthus
  Distorsio
 †Distorsio crassidens
 Divalinga
 †Divalinga quadrisulcata
 †Divalinga quadrisulcatus
 †Dixieus
 †Dixieus dixie – or unidentified comparable form
 Donax
 †Donax aequilibrata
 †Donax emmonsi
  †Donax fossor
 †Donax idoneus
  †Donax variabilis
  Dosinia
 †Dosinia acetabulum
 †Dosinia discus
 Dosinidia
 †Dosinidia elegans
 †Dossetia
 †Dossetia hyalina
 †Druidia – type locality for genus
 †Druidia wilsoni – type locality for species

E

 †Eburneopecten
 †Eburneopecten scintillatus
  Echinocardium
 †Echinocardium kelloggi
 Echinocyamus
 †Echinocyamus bisexus
 †Echinocyamus parvus
 Echinocythereis
 †Echinocythereis leecreekensis
 †Echinocythereis planibasalis
 †Echinocytheris
 Echinolampas
 †Echinolampas appendiculata
 †Echinolampas appendiculatus
  Echinorhinus
 †Echinorhinus blakei – or unidentified comparable form
 †Ecphora
 †Ecphora aurora
 †Ecphora pamlico
 †Ecphora tampaensis
 †Ecphora tricostata
 †Ecphora wheeleri – type locality for species
 †Ectopistes
  †Ectopistes migratorius – or unidentified related form
 Electra
  Elphidium
 †Elphidium clavatum
 †Elphidium gunteri
 †Elphidium limatulum
 †Elphidium neocrespinae
 Emarginula
 Encope
 †Encope macrophora
 †Endictya
 †Endictya robusta
 Endopachys
  Ensis
 †Ensis directus
 †Ensis veritis
 Ensitellops
 †Ensitellops elongata
 †Ensitellops protexta
 †Eocarpilius
 †Eocarpilius blowi – type locality for species
 †Eoepondilla
 †Eoepondilla hemisphaericus – or unidentified comparable form
 Eontia
 †Eontia ponderosa
  Epinephelus
 Epistominella
 †Epistominella danvillensis
  Epitonium
 †Epitonium aequabile – type locality for species
 †Epitonium apiculatum
 †Epitonium carolinae
 †Epitonium dignitate
 †Epitonium dignitatis – type locality for species
 †Epitonium fasciatum
 †Epitonium fractum
 †Epitonium humphreysii
 †Epitonium junceum
 †Epitonium leai
 †Epitonium pratti
 †Epitonium robesonense
 †Epitonium rupicola
 †Epitonium sohli
  Equetus
 †Equetus umbrosus – or unidentified comparable form
 Ervilia
 †Ervilia lata
 Erycina
 †Erycina carolinensis
 †Erycinella
 †Erycinella ovalis
 Eucalathis
 Eucrassatella – tentative report
 †Eucymba
 Eucythere
 †Eucythere declivus
 †Eucythere f informal
 †Eucythere gibba
 †Eucythere triangulata
  Eudocimus
  Eulima
 †Eulima juncea
 †Eupatagas
 †Eupatagas carolinensis
 Eupatagus
 †Eupatagus carolinensis
 †Eupatagus lawsonae
 †Eupatagus wilsoni
 Eupleura
 †Eupleura caudata
 †Eurhodia
 †Eurhodia baumi
 †Eurhodia depressa
 †Eurhodia holmesi
 †Eurhodia ideali
 †Eurhodia rugosa
 Eurytellina
 †Eurytellina alternata
 †Euscalpellum
 †Euscalpellum carolinensis
  Euspira
 †Euspira heros
 †Euspira vicksburgensis
 †Eutrephoceras
 †Eutrephoceras berryi
 †Eutrephoceras carolinense
 †Eutrephoceras carolinensis
 Euvola
  †Euvola raveneli
 †Evilia
 †Evilia lata
 †Exanthesis
 †Exanthesis ovatus – type locality for species

F

 Fabella
 †Fabella calpix
 Fasciolaria
 †Fasciolaria cronlyensis
 †Fasciolaria elegans
 †Fasciolaria sparrowi
  †Fasciolaria tulipa
 Fenimorea
 †Fenimorea polygonalis
 †Ficopsis
  Ficus
 †Ficus affinis
 †Ficus communis
 †Ficus harrisi – or unidentified comparable form
 †Ficus mississippiensis
 Flabellum
 †Florilus
 †Florilus spissus
 Fratercula
  †Fratercula arctica – or unidentified related form
 †Fratercula cirrhata – or unidentified related form
 †Fraxinus
 Fulgurofusus
 †Fulgurofusus elongatus
 Fusimitra
 Fusinus
 †Fusinus abruptus
 †Fusinus exilis
 †Fusinus heilprini
 †Fusinus hoffmani

G

 Gadus
  †Gadus morhua – or unidentified comparable form
 Galeocerdo
 †Galeocerdo aduncas
 †Galeocerdo contortus
  †Galeocerdo cuvier – or unidentified comparable form
 Galeodea
 †Galeodea britti – type locality for species
 Galeorhinus
 †Galeorhinus affinis
  †Galeorhinus galeus
 †Galeorhinus latus
 Gari
 †Gari eborea
 Gastrochaena
 Gavia
 †Gavia concinna
 †Gavia egeriana
 †Gavia fortis – type locality for species
 †Gavia howardae
 Gemma
 †Gemma cravenensis
 †Gemma gemma
 †Gemma magna
  Geochelone
 Geodia
 †Geodia harmatuki – type locality for species
 Gibbolucina
 †Gibbolucina pandata – or unidentified comparable form
 †Gigantostrea
 †Gigantostrea trigonalis
 Ginglymostoma
 †Glabocythara
 †Gledistia
  Globicephala
 Globigerina
 †Globigerina anguliofficinalis – or unidentified comparable form
 †Globigerina apertura
  †Globigerina bulloides
 †Globigerina calida
 †Globigerina decoraperta
 †Globigerina euapertura
 †Globigerina falconensis
 †Globigerina juvenilis
 †Globigerina woodi
 Globigerinita
 †Globigerinita altiaperturus
 †Globigerinita glutinata
 †Globigerinita uvula
 Globigerinoides
 †Globigerinoides bollii
 †Globigerinoides conglobatus
 †Globigerinoides obiquus
 †Globigerinoides obliquus
 †Globigerinoides quadrilobatus
 †Globigerinoides ruber
 Globivenus
 †Globivenus judithae
 †Globivenus lockei
 †Globoquadrina
 †Globoquadrina altispira
 †Globoquadrina venezuelana
 Globorotalia
 †Globorotalia acostaensis
 †Globorotalia crassula
 †Globorotalia cultrata
 †Globorotalia hexagona
 †Globorotalia hirsuta
 †Globorotalia margaritae
 †Globorotalia menardii
 †Globorotalia praeoscitans
 †Globorotalia puncticulata
 †Globorotalia scitula
 †Globorotalia truncatulinoides – or unidentified comparable form
 Glossus
 †Glossus fraterna
  Glycymeris
 †Glycymeris americana
 †Glycymeris anteparilis – type locality for species
 †Glycymeris cookei – or unidentified related form
 †Glycymeris duplinensis
 †Glycymeris duplinicus – or unidentified comparable form
 †Glycymeris hummi
 †Glycymeris sloani
 †Glycymeris tumulus
  Glyphostoma
 †Glyphostoma scoptes
 †Glyphostoma zoster
 Glyphoturris
 †Glyphoturris eritima
 Glyptoactis
 †Glyptoactis nasuta – tentative report
  †Gomphotherium
 †Goniothecium
 †Goniothecium rogersii
 Gouldia
 †Gouldia metastriata
 †Gouldia platycostata – type locality for species
 Granulina
 †Granulina ovuliformis
 †Gricetoides – type locality for genus
 †Gricetoides aurorae – type locality for species
 Grus
  †Grus americana – or unidentified related form
 †Grus antigone – or unidentified related form
 †Gryphaeostrea
 †Gryphaeostrea vomer
 †Gryphoca
 †Gryphoca similis
 Gyroidinoides
 †Gyroidinoides octocameratus

H

 †Hadrosaurus
 †Hadrosaurus tripos – type locality for species
 Haematopus
 †Haematopus ostralegus – or unidentified related form
  †Haematopus palliatus – or unidentified related form
 Halicalyptra
 †Halicalyptra picassoi
 Hanzawaia
 †Hanzawaia concentrica
 Haplocytheridea
 †Haplocytheridea perarcuata – or unidentified comparable form
 Harvella
 Hastigerina
 †Hastigerina siphonifera
 Haustator – tentative report
 †Haustator zulloi – type locality for species
 †Haynespongia – type locality for genus
 †Haynespongia vokesae – type locality for species
 †Hazelina – type locality for genus
 †Hazelina bisbifurcata – type locality for species
 †Hazelina conleycreekensis
 Heilprinia
 †Heilprinia carolinensis
 †Heliornis
  †Heliornis fulica – or unidentified related form
  †Hemiauchenia – or unidentified comparable form
 †Hemiaulus
 †Hemiaulus polymorphus – or unidentified comparable form
 Hemimactra
 †Hemimactra duplinensis
 †Hemimactra modicella
 †Hemimactra solidissima
 Hemipristis
  †Hemipristis serra
 †Hemipristis wyattdurhami
 †Hemirhabdorhynchus
 Hermanites
 †Hermanites ascitus
 †Herpetocetus
 †Herpetocetus sendaicus
 †Herpetocetus transatlanticus – type locality for species
 Hesperibalanus
 †Hesperibalanus kellumi
  Heterodontus
 †Heterodontus janefirdae – type locality for species
  Hexanchus
 Hiatella
  †Hiatella arctica
 Hippoporella
 †Hippoporella gorgonensis – or unidentified comparable form
 Hippoporina
 †Hippoporina pertusa – or unidentified comparable form
 †Hirschmannia – tentative report
 †Hirschmannia hespera
 †Hirschmannia quadrata
 Histrionicus
  †Histrionicus histrionicus – or unidentified related form
 †Homiphoca
 †Homiphoca capensis
 Hulingsina
 †Hulingsina americana
 †Hulingsina c informal
 †Hulingsina f informal
 †Hulingsina glabra
 †Hulingsina r informal
 †Hulingsina rugipustulosa
 †Hulingsina u informal
 Hyalina
 †Hyalina macronuclea
 †Hyalodiscus
 †Hyalodiscus laevis
 Hydroides – tentative report
 †Hypogaleus

I

 †Idiocythere
 †Idiocythere washingtonensis
 Illyanassa
 Ilyanassa
 †Ilyanassa arata
 †Ilyanassa granifera
 †Ilyanassa harpuloides
 †Ilyanassa harpwoides
 †Ilyanassa irrorata
 †Ilyanassa irrorota
 †Ilyanassa isogramma
 †Ilyanassa johnsoni
 †Ilyanassa obsoleta
 †Ilyanassa porcina – or unidentified comparable form
 †Ilyanassa scalaspira
 †Ilyanassa schizapyga
 †Ilyanassa schizopyga
 †Ilyanassa sexdentata
 †Ilyanassa trivitta
  †Ilyanassa trivittata
 †Ilyanassa wilmingtonensis
 Ischadium
 †Ischadium recurvum
  Isistius
 Isoetes
 Isognomon
 Istiophorus
  †Istiophorus platypterus
 Isurus
 †Isurus americanus
  †Isurus oxyrinchus
 Ithycythara
 †Ithycythara psila

J

 Juliacorbula
 †Juliacorbula scutata
 Juniperus
  †Juniperus virginiana – or unidentified comparable form

K

 Kalolophus
 †Kalolophus antillarum
 †Kathetostoma
 †Kellum
  †Kentriodon
 †Kentriodon schneideri – type locality for species
 †Kleidionella
 †Kleidionella grandis
 Kogia – or unidentified comparable form
  †Kogia breviceps
 †Kogiopsis – or unidentified comparable form
 †Kogiopsis floridana
 Kuphus
 †Kuphus calamus
 Kurtziella
 †Kurtziella cerina
 †Kurtziella cerinella
 †Kurtziella magnoliana
 †Kyptoceras
 †Kyptoceras amatorum

L

 Laevicardium
 †Laevicardium mortoni
 †Laevicardium serratum
 †Laevicardium sublineatum
 †Laevicardum
 †Laevicardum sublineatum
 Lagena
 †Lagena substriata
  Lagenorhynchus
 †Lagenorhynchus harmatuki – type locality for species
 †Lagodon
 †Lagodon rhomboides – or unidentified comparable form
  Lamna
 †Laocoetis
 †Laocoetis crassipes – or unidentified comparable form
 Larus
 †Larus argentatus – or unidentified related form
  †Larus atricilla – or unidentified related form
 †Larus delawarensis – or unidentified related form
 †Larus minutus – or unidentified related form
 †Larus ribibundus
 †Leguminocythereis
 †Leguminocythereis scarabaeus – or unidentified related form
  Leiostomus
 Lemintina
 †Lemintina granifera
  Lepidochelys
 †Lepophridium
 †Lepophridium cervinum – or unidentified comparable form
 Leptocythere
 †Leptocythere e informal
 †Leptocythere f informal
 †Leptocythere nikravshae
 Leptopecten
 †Leptopecten auroraensis
 †Levifusus
 †Levifusus spiniger
  Limaria
 Linga
 †Linga waccamawensis
 †Linthia
 †Linthia hanoverensis – type locality for species
 †Linthia harmatuki
 †Linthia wilmingtonensis
  Liquidambar
 †Liradiscus
 †Liradiscus asperulus
 †Liradiscus bipolaris
 †Liradiscus ovalis
 Lirophora
 †Lirophora latilirata
 †Lithodesmium
 †Lithodesmium minisculum
 Littoraria
 †Littoraria irrorata
 Littorina
 †Lobonotus
 †Lobonotus sturgeoni – type locality for species
 †Lonicera
 Lophius
  †Lophius americanus – or unidentified comparable form
 †Lophocetus – or unidentified related form
 †Lophocetus pappus
 Lopholatilus
  †Lopholatilus chamaeleonticeps
 †Lopholatilus rayus
 †Lophoranina
 †Lophoranina raynorae
 Loxoconcha
 †Loxoconcha c informal
 †Loxoconcha creolensis – or unidentified comparable form
 †Loxoconcha edentonensis
 †Loxoconcha h informal
 †Loxoconcha m informal
 †Loxoconcha matagordensis
 †Loxoconcha purisubrhomboidea
 †Loxoconcha reticularis
 †Loxoconcha s informal
 †Loxoconcha t informal
 Lucina
 †Lucina micraulax – type locality for species
 †Lucina pensylvanica
 Lucinisca
 †Lucinisca cribrarius
 †Lucinisca nassula
 Lucinoma
 †Lucinoma contracta
 Lyria
 †Lyria carolinensis – type locality for species
 †Lyria concinna – type locality for species
 †Lyropecten
 †Lyropecten ernestsmithi

M

  Macoma
 †Macoma carolinensis
 Macrocallista
 †Macrocallista acuminata
 †Macrocallista greeni
 †Macrocallista minuscula – type locality for species
 †Macrocallista neusensis
 †Macrocallista nimbosa
 †Macrocallista perovata
 †Macrocallista reposta
 †Macrocallista tia – type locality for species
 Macrocyprina
 †Macrocyprina gibsonensis
 †Macromphalina
 †Macromphalina hanseni
 †Macromphalina pierrot
 Macropneustes
 †Macropneustes carolinensis
 †Macrora
 †Macrora stella
 Mactrotoma
 †Mactrotoma fragilis
  Makaira
 †Makaira indica
  †Makaira nigricans
 †Makaira purdyi – type locality for species
 Malzella
 †Malzella conradi
 †Malzella evexa
 †Mammut
  †Mammut americanum
 Manta
 †Manta melanyae – type locality for species
  Maretia
 †Maretia subostrata
 †Maretia subrostrata
 †Maretia subrostratus
 Marevalvata
 †Marevalvata tricarinata
  Marginella
 †Marginella denticulata
 †Marvacrassatella
 †Marvacrassatella kauffmani
 †Marvacrassatella turgidula – tentative report
 †Marvacrassatella undulatus
 †Matutites
 †Matutites miltonorum – type locality for species
 †Mclelannia
 †Mclelannia aenigma
 †Mediaria
 †Mediaria splendida
  Megachasma
 Megalops
 †Megalops atlanticus – or unidentified comparable form
  Megaptera
 †Megascyliorhinus
 †Megascyliorhinus miocaenicus
 †Meherrinia – type locality for genus
 †Meherrinia isoni – type locality for species
 Meiocardia
 †Meiocardia carolinae
 Melanella
 †Melanella conoidea
 †Melanella eborea
 †Melanella jamaicensis
 Melanitta
 †Melanitta nigra – or unidentified related form
 †Melanitta perspicillata – or unidentified related form
 Melanogrammus
  †Melanogrammus aeglefinus – or unidentified comparable form
 Meleagris
 Mellita
 †Mellita aclinensis – or unidentified comparable form
 †Melosira
 †Melosira westii
 Menippe – tentative report
 Mercenaria
 †Mercenaria campechiensis
 †Mercenaria capax
 †Mercenaria carolinensis
 †Mercenaria corrugata
 †Mercenaria druidi
 †Mercenaria erecta – type locality for species
 †Mercenaria gardnerae – type locality for species
  †Mercenaria mercenaria
 †Mercenaria permagna
 Meretrix
 †Meretrix securiformis – tentative report
 Mergus
  †Mergus serrator – or unidentified related form
 †Merlangiogadus
 †Merlangiogadus congatus
 Merluccius
  †Merluccius albidus
 †Merluccius bilinearis – or unidentified comparable form
 †Mesocena
 †Mesocena elliptica – or unidentified comparable form
  Mesoplodon
 †Mesoplodon longirostris
 †Mesoteras – type locality for genus
 †Mesoteras kerrianus – type locality for species
 Metulella
 †Metulella styliola
 Microcytherura
 †Microcytherura choctawhatcheensis
 †Microcytherura d informal
 †Microcytherura expanda
 †Microcytherura h informal
 †Microcytherura m informal
 †Microcytherura minuta
 †Microcytherura p informal
 †Microcytherura r informal
 †Microcytherura similis
 Microgadus
  †Microgadus tomcod – or unidentified comparable form
 Micropogonias
 Miltha
 †Miltha pandata
 †Miltha pandatus – tentative report
 †Miocepphus
 †Miocepphus mcclungi
 †Miocepphus mergulellus – type locality for species
 †Miocepphus undescribedspecies informal
 Mitra
 †Mitra carolinensis
 Mitrella
 †Mitrella gardnerae
 †Mitrella waccamawensis
  Mobula
 Modiolus
 †Modiolus ducatellii
 †Modiolus modiolus
 Mola
 †Mola chelonopsis
  Monodon – or unidentified comparable form
 Morum
 †Morum harpula
 Morus
 †Morus atlanticus
 †Morus avitus
 †Morus loxostylus
 †Morus peninsularis
 †Morus undescribedspeciesone informal
 †Morus undescribedspeciestwo informal
 Muellerina
 †Muellerina bassiounii
 †Muellerina blowi
 †Muellerina ohmerti
 †Muellerina p informal
 †Muellerina petersburgensis
 †Muellerina wardi
 Mulinia
 †Mulinia congesta
 †Mulinia lateralis
 †Murrayina
 †Murrayina barclayi
 Musculus
 †Musculus lateralis
 Mustelus
 †Mya
  †Mya arenaria
 †Mya wilsoni
  Mycteroperca
  Myliobatis
 Myochama
  Myriophyllum
 †Myriophyllum heterophyllum
 †Myriophyllum scabratum
 Mysella
 †Mysella beaufortensis
 †Mysella bladenensis
 †Mysella majorina
 †Mysella planulata
 †Mysella stantoni
 †Mysella velaini
 Mytilus
 †Mytilus conradinus

N

  †Nannippus
 †Nannippus lenticularis
 †Nannolithax
 †Nanogyra
 †Nanogyra virgula
 †Nanosiren – tentative report
  Nassarius
 †Nassarius acutus
 †Nassarius antillarum
 †Nassarius bidentata
 †Nassarius caloosaensis
 †Nassarius chowanensis
 †Nassarius consensoides
 †Nassarius cornelliana
 †Nassarius lapenotierei
 †Nassarius neogenensis
 †Nassarius schizopyga – tentative report
 †Nassarius smithiana
 †Nassarius suffolkensis – or unidentified comparable form
 †Nassarius vibex
 †Nassarius zeta
 Naticarius
  †Navicula
 †Navicula directa
 †Navicula hennedyii
 †Navicula pennata
 Negaprion
 †Negaprion brevirostris
 †Negaprion furimskyi – type locality for species
 Nemocardium
 †Nemocardium diversum
 Neocaudites
 †Neocaudites angulatus
 †Neocaudites subimpressus
 †Neocaudites variabilus
  †Neohipparion
 †Neohipparion eurystyle – or unidentified comparable form
  Neophrontops – tentative report
 Neverita
 †Neverita duplicatus
 †Ninoziphius
 †Ninoziphius platyrostris
 Niso
 †Niso dalli
  †Nitzschia
 †Nitzschia b informal
 Niveria
 †Niveria suffusa
 Noetia
 †Noetia carolinensis
 †Noetia limula
 Nonion
 †Nonion mauricensis
 †Nonion pizarrense
 Nonionella
 †Nonionella auris
 Notidanus
 †Notidanus serratissimus
 Notorynchus
 †Notorynchus cepidanus
 Nucleolites
 †Nucleolites berryi – type locality for species
 †Nucleolites carolinensis
 †Nucleolites raveneli
 Nucula
 †Nucula magnifica
 †Nucula ovula
 †Nucula proxima
 †Nucula sphenopsis
 †Nucula taphria
 Nuculana
 †Nuculana acuta
 †Nuculana magna
 †Nuculana plana
 Numenius
  †Numenius borealis – or unidentified related form
 †Nuphar
  Nymphaea
 †Nyssa

O

 Odontaspis
 †Odontaspis acutissima
  †Odontaspis ferox
 †Odontaspis koerti – tentative report
 †Odontogryphaea
 †Odontogryphaea thirsae
  Odostomia
 †Odostomia acutidens
 †Odostomia simplex
 Oliva
 †Oliva carolinensis
 †Oliva posti
 †Oliva robesonensis
  †Oliva sayana
 Olivella
 †Olivella carolinae
 †Olivella minuta
 †Olivella mutica
 Onoba
 †Onoba geraea
 †Ontocetus – type locality for genus
 †Ontocetus emmonsi – type locality for species
 Oocorys
 †Oocorys vadosus – type locality for species
 Ophidion
 †Ophidion grayi
 †Ophiraphidites
 †Ophiraphidites hadros – type locality for species
 †Opimocythere
 †Opimocythere martini
 †Opsanus
  †Opsanus tau
 Orbulina
 †Orbulina suturalis
 †Orbulina uiversa
 Orionina
 †Orionina vaughani
 Ortalis – tentative report
 †Orthosurcula
 †Orthosurcula aequa – type locality for species
  †Orycterocetus
 †Orycterocetus cornutidens – type locality for species
 †Orycterocetus quadratidens
 †Osmunda
  †Osmunda regalis
 Ostrea
 †Ostrea compressirostra
 †Ostrea compressirostris
 †Ostrea disparilis
 †Ostrea falco
 †Ostrea mauricensis
 Ostrya
 †Otodus
 †Otodus angustidens
  †Otodus megalodon

P

 Pachyptila
    Pagrus
 †Pagrus hyneus
 †Palaciosa
 †Palaciosa minuta
 †Paleophoca
 †Paleophoca nystii
 Pandion
 Pandora
 †Pandora arenosa
 †Pandora naviculoides
 †Pandora trilineata
 †Pandora tuomeyi
 Panopea
 †Panopea goldfussii
 †Panopea reflexa
 Paraconcavus
 †Paraconcavus prebrevicalcar
 Paracyprideis
 †Paracyprideis c informal
 Paracypris
 †Paracypris b informal
 Paracytheridea
 †Paracytheridea altida
 †Paracytheridea cronini
 †Paracytheridea f informal
 †Paracytheridea mucra
 †Paracytheridea rugosa
 †Paracytheridea toleri
 †Paracytheroma
 †Paracytheroma stephensoni
 Paradoxostoma
 †Paradoxostoma delicata
 †Paradoxostoma e informal
  Paragaleus
 †Paralia
 †Paralia complexa
 †Paralia sulcata
  Paralichthys
 †Paramya
 †Paramya subovata
 Paranesidea – tentative report
 †Paranesidea laevicula
  †Parotodus
 †Parotodus benedenii
 Parvanachis
 †Parvanachis obesa
 Parvilucina
 †Parvilucina costata
 †Parvilucina crenella
 †Parvilucina crenulata
 †Parvilucina multilineatus
 †Parvilucina multistriata
 †Pecchiola
 †Pecchiola dalliana
 †Pecchiolia
 †Pecchiolia dalliana
 Pecten
 †Pecten biddeleana – or unidentified comparable form
 †Pecten chickaria
 †Pecten elixatus
 †Pecten humphreysii
 †Pecten mclellani – type locality for species
 †Pecten membranosus
 †Pecten perplanus
  †Pediastrum
 †Pediastrum boryanum
 †Pediomeryx
  †Pelagornis
 †Pelagornis speciesone informal
 †Pelagornis speciestwo informal
  Pelecanus
 †Pelecanus schreiberi – type locality for species
 Peratocytheridea
 †Peratocytheridea bradyi
 †Peratocytheridea j informal
 †Peratocytheridea sandbergi
 †Peratocytheridea setipunctata
 †Periarchus
 †Periarchus lyelli
 †Periptera
 †Periptera tetracladia
  Perotrochus
 †Perotrochus hanoverensis – type locality for species
 Petaloconchus
 †Petaloconchus graniferus
 †Petaloconchus virginica
 Petricola
 †Petricola carolinensis
 †Petricola grinnelli
 †Petricola pectorosa
 †Petricola pholadiformis
  Phalacrocorax
 †Phalacrocorax largespecies informal
 †Phalacrocorax wetmorei
 Phalium
 †Phalium newbernensis – type locality for species
 †Phocageneus – or unidentified related form
 †Phocageneus venustus
 †Phocanella
 †Phocanella pumila
 †Phoebastria
  †Phoebastria albatrus – or unidentified related form
 †Phoebastria anglica
 †Phoebastria immutabilis – or unidentified related form
 †Phoebastria nigripes – or unidentified related form
 †Phoebastria rexularum
  Phoenicopterus
 †Phoenicopterus floridanus – or unidentified comparable form
 Pholadomya
 †Pholadomya claibornensis
 Phyllacanthus
 †Phyllacanthus carolinensis
 †Phyllacanthus mitchellii
 Phyllonotus
 †Phyllonotus davisi
 †Phyllonotus pomum
 Physeter – or unidentified comparable form
  †Physeter macrocephalus
 †Physeterula – or unidentified comparable form
 †Physeterula dubusi
 Picea
  †Pinguinus
 †Pinguinus alfrednewtoni – type locality for species
 Pinna – tentative report
 †Pinna harnetti
 Pinus
 †Pinus palustris – or unidentified comparable form
 Pisania
 †Pisania nux
 Pitar
 †Pitar castoriana
 †Pitar chioneformis
 †Pitar morrhuanus
 †Pitar ovatus
 Placopecten
 †Placopecten clintonius
 †Placopecten magellanicus – or unidentified related form
 †Placopecten princepoides
 †Plagiarca
 †Plagiarca rhomboidella
 Plagiobrissus
 †Platyphoca
 †Platyphoca vulgaris
 †Plectroninia
 †Plectroninia pertusa – type locality for species
 †Plejona
 †Plejona conoides – tentative report
 †Plejona petrosa
  †Plesiocetus – or unidentified comparable form
 Pleurofusia
 †Pleurofusia menthafons
 Pleuromeris
 †Pleuromeris auroraensis
 †Pleuromeris decemcostata
 †Pleuromeris quadrata
 †Pleuromeris tridentata
 †Pleurosigma
 †Pleurosigma affine
  Pleurotomaria
 †Pleurotomaria nixa
 †Plicatoria
 †Plicatoria ventricosa
 †Plicatoria wilmingtonensis
 Plicatula
 †Plicatula densata
 †Plicatula filamentosa
 †Plicatula gibbosa
 †Plinthicus
 †Plinthicus stenodon
 †Pliopontos
 †Pliopontos littoralis
 Pluvialis
  †Pluvialis squatarola – or unidentified related form
 Podiceps
  †Podiceps auritus
 Pododesmus
 †Pododesmus waccamawensis
 Pogonias
 †Pogonias cromis – or unidentified comparable form
 Polinices
 Polydora
 Polygireulima
 †Polygireulima spatulata
 Polygonum
 Polymesoda
 †Polymesoda caroliniana
  Pomatomus
 †Pomatomus salatrix
  †Pontederia
 Pontocythere – report made of unidentified related form or using admittedly obsolete nomenclature
 †Pontocythere d informal
 †Pontocythere g informal
 †Pontocythere i informal
 †Pontocythere j informal
 Pontoporia – or unidentified comparable form
 Populus
 †Potamogeton
 Prionotus
 †Prionotus evolans – or unidentified comparable form
 Pristiophorus
  Pristis
 †Pristis curvidens
 †Pristis pectinatus – or unidentified comparable form
 †Probolarina
 †Probolarina breviostris – type locality for species
 †Probolarina holmesi
 †Probolarina holmesii
 †Probolarina salpinx
 Procellaria
  †Procellaria aequinoctialis – or unidentified comparable form
 †Procellaria parkinsoni – or unidentified comparable form
 †Procolpochelys
 Propontocypris
 †Propontocypris d
 Proteoconcha
 †Proteoconcha gigantica
 †Proteoconcha jamesensis
 †Proteoconcha mimica
 †Proteoconcha multipunctata
 †Proteoconcha tuberculata
 †Proteoconcha z informal
 †Protoscutella
 †Protoscutella conradi
 †Protoscutella plana
 †Protoscutella rosehillensis
 †Protosiren
  Prunum
 †Prunum bellum
 †Prunum limatulum
 †Prunum roscidum
 Psammacoma
 Psammechinus
 †Psammechinus philanthropus
  †Psephophorus
  †Pseudhipparion
 †Pseudhipparion simpsoni
 Pseudochama
 †Pseudochama corticosa
 Pseudocytheretta
 †Pseudocytheretta burnsi
 †Pseudodimerogramma
 †Pseudodimerogramma eliptica
 Pseudomiltha
 †Pseudomiltha nocariensis – type locality for species
 †Pseudopyxilla
 †Pseudopyxilla americana
  Pseudorca
 Pseudotorinia
 †Pseudotorinia nupera
 Pteria
 Pterodroma
 †Pterodroma lessonii
 †Pterodromoides
 †Pterodromoides minoricensis
 Pteromeris
 †Pteromeris abbreviata
 †Pteromeris perplana
 Pteromylaeus
  Pterothrissus
 Pterygocythereis
 †Pterygocythereis inexpectata
 †Ptychosalpinx
 †Ptychosalpinx multirugata
 †Ptychosalpinx tuomeyi
  Puffinus
 †Puffinus gravis – or unidentified related form
 †Puffinus lherminieri
 †Puffinus pacificoides – or unidentified related form
 †Puffinus puffinus – or unidentified comparable form
  †Puffinus tenuirostris – or unidentified related form
 Pugnus
 †Pugnus lachrimula
 Puncturella
 Puriana
 †Puriana carolinensis
 †Puriana convoluta
 †Puriana mesacostalis
 †Puriana rugipunctata
 Purpura
 †Purpura cellulosa
 Purpurellus
 †Purpurellus repetiti – type locality for species
 Pusula
 †Pusula pediculus
 †Pycnodone
 Pycnodonte
 †Pycnodonte leeana
 †Pycnodonte paroxis
 †Pycnodonte trigonalis
 †Pynonodonte
 †Pynonodonte trigonalis
  Pyramidella
 †Pyramidella crenuata
 †Pyxilla
 †Pyxilla johnsoniana

Q

 †Quadrans
 †Quadrans lintea
  Quercus

R

 Radimella
 †Radimella confragros
 Radiolucina
 †Radiolucina amianta
 Raeta
 †Raeta plicatella
 Raja
 Rangia
 †Rangia cuneata
  Ranina – type locality for genus
  Ranunculus
 †Raphidodiscus
 †Raphidodiscus marylandica
 †Rebeccapecten
 †Rebeccapecten berryae
 †Rebeccapecten trentensis
 †Recurvaster
 Retilaskeya
 †Retilaskeya bicolor
 †Rhaphoneis
 †Rhaphoneis affinis
 †Rhaphoneis biseriata
 †Rhaphoneis elegans
 †Rhaphoneis gemmifera
 †Rhaphoneis paralis
 †Rhaphoneis rhombica
  Rhincodon
  Rhinobatos
  Rhinoptera
 Rhizoprionodon – tentative report
 †Rhizosolenia
 †Rhizosolenia bergonii
 †Rhizosolenia miocenica
 Rhynchobatus
 †Rhynchobatus pristinus
 Rhyncholampas
 †Rhyncholampas carolinensis
  †Rhynchotherium
 †Rhynchotherium euhypodon – or unidentified comparable form
 Ringicula
 Rissoina
 †Rissoina harpa
 †Robinia – type locality for genus
 †Robinia striatopunctata – type locality for species
 Rosalina
 †Rosalina floridana
 †Rouxia
 †Rouxia californica
 †Rouxia diploneides
 †Rouxia naviculoides
 †Rouxia yabei

S

 Saccella
 Sagittaria
 †Sanguisorba
  †Sanguisorba canadensis
 †Santeelampas
 †Santeelampas oviformis
 †Sarda
  †Sarda sarda – or unidentified related form
  †Scaldicetus – or unidentified comparable form
 Scalina
 †Scalina menthafontis – or unidentified related form
 Scaphella
 †Scaphella ocalana – tentative report
 †Scaphella pecursor
 †Scaphella saintjeani – type locality for species
 †Scaphella stromboidella – type locality for species
 †Scaphella trenholmii
 †Sceptroneis
 †Sceptroneis grandis
 Schizaster
 Sciaenops
 †Sciaenops ocellata – or unidentified comparable form
 †Sciaenops ocellatus
 Sclerochilus
 †Sclerochilus b informal
  †Scoliodon
 †Scoliodon terraenovae
 Sconsia
 †Sconsia hodgii
 †Scutella
  Scyliorhinus
 †Scyliorhinus distans
 †Secticarca
 †Secticarca lienosa
 Seila
 †Seila adamsii
 Semele
 †Semele bellastriata
 †Semele carinata
 †Semele nuculoides
 †Semele proficua
 †Semele subovata
  Semicassis
 †Semicassis caelatura
 †Septastrea
 †Septastrea crassa
  Seriola
 Serpulorbis
 †Serpulorbis ganifera
 †Serpulorbis granifera
 †Sheldonia – type locality for genus
 †Sheldonia trabecula – type locality for species
 Siliqua
 †Siliqua costata
 Sincola
 †Sincola anomala
 Sinum
 †Sinum imperforatum
 †Sinum maculata
 †Sinum perspectivum
 Siphocypraea
 †Siphocypraea carolinensis
 Siphogenerina
 †Siphogenerina lamellata
  Siphonalia
 †Siphonalia devexus – or unidentified comparable form
 Siphonochelus
 †Siphonochelus siphonifera
 Solariella
 †Solariella gemma
 Solen
 †Solen viridis
 Solena
 Solenosteira
 †Solenosteira cancellaria
 Somateria
  †Somateria mollissima – or unidentified related form
 †Spathiopora
 Spathipora
 †Sphaeroidinellopsis
 †Sphaeroidinellopsis seminulina
 †Sphaeroidinellopsis subdehiscens
 Sphagnum
 Sphenia
 †Sphenia dubia
  †Sphoeroides
 †Sphoeroides hyperostosus
 Sphyraena
  †Sphyraena barracuda – or unidentified comparable form
 Sphyrna
  †Sphyrna lewini
 †Sphyrna media – or unidentified comparable form
 †Sphyrna zygaena
 Spiroplectammina
 †Spiroplectammina mississippiensis
 Spisula
 †Spisula modicella
 Spondylus
 †Spondylus lamellacea – type locality for species
 Sportella
 †Sportella calpix
 †Sportella compressa
 †Sportella constricta
 †Sportella gibberosa
 †Sportella waccamawensis
  †Squalodon
 †Squalodon calvertensis
 †Squalodon tiedemani
 †Squalodon whitmorei – or unidentified comparable form
 Squalus
 Squatina
 †Squatina subserrata
 Stellatoma – report made of unidentified related form or using admittedly obsolete nomenclature
 †Stellatoma stellata
 †Stelletta
 †Stelletta silvigera – type locality for species
  Stenella
 †Stenella rayi – type locality for species
 †Stenotomus
  †Stenotomus chrysops – or unidentified comparable form
 †Stephanogonia
 †Stephanogonia actinoptychus
 †Stephanopyxis
 †Stephanopyxis corona
 †Stephanopyxis grunowii
 †Stephanopyxis lineata
 †Stephanopyxis turris
 Stercorarius
  †Stercorarius longicaudus – or unidentified related form
 †Stercorarius parasiticus – or unidentified related form
 †Stercorarius pomarinus – or unidentified related form
 Sterna
  †Sterna maxima – or unidentified related form
 †Sterna nilotica – or unidentified related form
 Stewartia
 †Stewartia anodonta
 †Stictodiscus
 †Stictodiscus kittonianus
 †Streptochetus
 †Streptochetus indistinctus
 †Striatolamia
 †Striatolamia macrota
 Strigilla
 †Striostrea
 †Striostrea gigantissima
  Strioterebrum
 †Strioterebrum carolinae
 †Strioterebrum carolinensis
 †Strioterebrum concava
 †Strioterebrum dislocata
 †Strioterebrum dislocatum
 †Strioterebrum neglecta
 †Strioterebrum protocta
 †Strioterebrum robesonensis
 Strombiformis
 †Strombiformis bartschi
 †Strombiformis dalli
 †Strombiformis lina
 Strombina
 Strombus
 †Svratkina
 †Svratkina croatanensis
 †Syllomus
 †Syllomus aegyptiacus
  Symphurus
 †Synedra
 †Synedra jouseana
 Syntomodrillia
 †Syntomodrillia lissotropis

T

 Tagelus
 †Tagelus carolinus
 †Tagelus divisus
 †Tagelus plebeius
  Tapirus
 †Tapirus veroensis
 Tautoga
 †Tautoga onitis – or unidentified comparable form
 Taxodium
  †Taxodium distichum
 Tectonatica
 †Tectonatica pusilla
 Teinostoma
 †Teinostoma beaufortensis
 †Teinostoma gonigyrus
 †Teinostoma smikron
 †Teinostoma smirkon
 †Teinostoma tectispira
 Tellidora
 †Tellidora cristata
 Tellina
 †Tellina dupliniana
 †Tellina macilenta
  Tenagodus
 †Tenagodus vitis
 †Tenagodus vitus – or unidentified comparable form
 Terebra
 †Terebra divisura
 †Terebra protexta
 †Terebra unilineata
 Terebratula
 †Terebratula crassa – type locality for species
 Terebratulina
 †Terebratulina capillata – type locality for species
 †Terebratulina lachryma
 †Terebratulina wilmingtonensis
 Terebripora
 †Tetraedron
 †Tetrapturus
  †Tetrapturus albidus
 Thaerocythere
 †Thaerocythere carolinensis
 †Thaerocythere schmidtae
 Thais
  †Thalassinoides
 †Thalassionema
 †Thalassionema nitzschiodes
 †Thalassiosira
 †Thalassiosira a informal
 †Thalassiosira b informal
 †Thalassiothix
 †Thalassiothix longissima
 †Thalictrum
  †Thecachampsa
 †Thecachampsa antiqua
 Thracia
 †Thracia brioni
 †Thracia conradi
 †Thracia transversa
 Thunnus
  †Thunnus thynnus
 Timoclea
 †Timoclea grus
 Titanocarcinus
 †Titanocarcinus euglyphos
 Torcula
 †Tornatellaea
 †Tortifusus
 †Tortifusus curvirostrus
 Trachycardium
 †Trachycardium emmonsi
  †Trachycardium isocardia
 †Trachycardium muricatum
 Trajana
 †Trajana pyta – type locality for species
 Transennella
 †Transennella carolinensis
 †Transennella stimpsoni
 †Tretosphys
 †Triaenodon
  †Triaenodon obesus
 †Triceratium
 †Triceratium condecorum
 †Triceratium subrotundatum
 †Triceratium tessellatum
 †Triginglymus
 Trigoniocardia
  Trigonostoma
 Trigonulina
 †Trigonulina emmonsii
 †Trinacria
 †Trinacria excavata
 Tringa
  †Tringa ochropus – or unidentified related form
 Trionyx
 †Trionyx buiei – type locality for species
 Triphora
 †Tritonopsis
 †Tritonopsis biconica
 †Tritonopsis gilletti
 Trochita
 †Trochita aperta
 †Trochita crenata – or unidentified comparable form
 †Trochosira
 †Trochosira concava
  Tucetona
 †Tucetona arata
 Turbo
 †Turbo castanea
 Turbonilla
 †Turbonilla abrupta
 †Turbonilla daedaleum
 †Turbonilla interrupta
 †Turbonilla nivea
 †Turborotalia
 †Turborotalia acostaensis
 †Turborotalia birnageae
 †Turborotalia humilis
 †Turborotalia inflata
 †Turborotalia quinqueloba
  Turritella
 †Turritella aequistriata – or unidentified comparable form
 †Turritella beaufortensis
 †Turritella caelatura
 †Turritella cumberlandia – or unidentified comparable form
 †Turritella fuerta – type locality for species
 †Turritella indenta – or unidentified comparable form
 †Turritella neusensis – type locality for species
 †Turritella perexilis
 †Turritella plebea
 †Turritella prexellis
 †Turritella subanulata
 †Turritella subtilis – type locality for species
 †Turritella tampae
  Tursiops
 Typha
 Typhis
 †Typhis harrisi

U

 †Unifascia
 †Unifascia carolinensis
 Uromitra
  Urophycis
 †Urophycis tenuis
 Urosalpinx
  †Urosalpinx cinerea
 †Urosalpinx perrugata
 †Urosalpinx phrikna
 †Urosalpinx stimpsoni
 †Urosalpinx suffolkensis
 †Urosalpinx trossula

V

 Vasum
 †Vasum wilmingtonense
 Venericardia
 †Venericardia nodifera – type locality for species
 Vermicularia
 †Vermicularia knorrii – or unidentified comparable form
 †Vermicularia spirata
 †Verrucocoeloidea
 †Verrucocoeloidea corallina – type locality for species
 Verticordia
 †Verticordia emmonsii
 Vexillum
 †Vexillum wandoense
  †Viburnum
 †Virgulina
 †Virgulina fusiformis
  Viviparus – tentative report
 †Viviparus lyelli
 Volutifusus
 †Volutifusus obtusa
 †Volutifusus typhis
 Volvarina
 †Volvarina avena

W

 †Wilsonimaia
 †Wilsonimaia ethelae

X

 †Xanthiopyxis
 Xenophora
 Xestoleberis
 †Xestoleberis e informal
 †Xestoleberis ventrostriata
  †Xiphiacetus
  Xiphias
 †Xiphias gladius
 †Xiphiorhynchus
 †Xiphiorhynchus antiquus

Y

 Yoldia
 †Yoldia laevis
  †Yoldia limatula
 †Yoldia limulata
 †Yoldia serica

Z

 Ziphius
  †Ziphius cavirostris – or unidentified comparable form

Notes

References
 

Cenozoic
North Carolina